Chen Xiuhuan (born 10 October 1965) is a Singaporean actress. She is a Mediacorp artiste from 1984 to 1997 and 2018 till today.

Career
Chen started her acting career at the age of 18 after attending the Singapore Broadcasting Corporation's drama training course. Her role in the fantasy drama Star Maiden, starring opposite Wang Yuqing, propelled her to stardom in 1988.

Chen quit her acting career in 1997 for marriage. She opened a bridal shop subsequently.

In 2005, Chen briefly returned to television in A Promise For Tomorrow. She has also appeared in several children's programmes.

Chen made a comeback in 2018 by playing as a wife to Chew Chor Meng since 20+ years since they last acted together in the drama called Fifty & Fabulous. In 2018,she was involved in some dramas which are Gifted,  The Distance Between &  Heart to Heart.

Personal life 
Chen married Cai Yi Peng, a Taiwanese businessman, in 1997.

After she had children, she never spoke to them about her former career. In fact, her three daughters almost never watch TV. When they were younger, they were banned from switching on the goggle box - "not even for cartoons", says Shanisse - and the rare times that they did get to watch TV, they tuned in to documentaries. Ms Tan, a self-professed tiger mum, says in Mandarin: "I was strict about that because I wanted them to watch only really good, educational programmes. "To them, I'm just their mother, not any sort of celebrity mum. So when people recognised me on the streets and called out my name, they used to be very puzzled and asked if those strangers were my friends.

Filmography

Accolades

References

Living people
Singaporean television actresses
Singaporean people of Hokkien descent
1965 births